Logol may refer to:

Logol people, southern Sudan
Logol language

See also
Lugol (disambiguation)
Logology (disambiguation)
Logo (disambiguation)